Mexican Academy may refer to:

The Academia Mexicana de la Lengua
The Mexican Academy of Sciences
The Mexican Academy of Film Arts and Sciences
The Mexican Academy of Human Rights, an NGO

See also
 Mexico Academy and Central School in New York State